Ballads & Blues 1982–1994 is a compilation album by Northern Irish rock guitarist, singer and songwriter Gary Moore. Released in 1994, the album encompasses the softer, romantic ballads and blues songs Moore had recorded since 1982. It contains three previously unreleased tracks; of these, the song "One Day" is actually an outtake from the album Around the Next Dream, recorded by supergroup BBM, of which Moore was a member.

Track listing

Sales and certifications

References

Gary Moore compilation albums
1994 compilation albums
Albums produced by James Barton (producer)
Albums produced by Jeff Glixman
Albums produced by Peter Collins (record producer)
Albums produced by Steve Levine
Charisma Records compilation albums